Elijah Clarke is a professional Muay Thai Kickboxer living in the United States.

Professional Muay Thai Record

References 
 

American Muay Thai practitioners
Living people
Year of birth missing (living people)
Muay Thai trainers